The following list includes societies that have been identified as matrilineal or matrilocal in ethnographic literature.

"Matrilineal" means kinship is passed down through the maternal line.

The Akans of Ghana, West Africa, are Matrilineal. Akans are the largest ethnic group in Ghana. They are made of the Akims, Asantes, Fantis, Akuapims, Kwahus, Denkyiras, Brongs, Akwamus, Krachis, etc.

"Matrilocal" means new families are established in proximity to the brides' extended family of origin, not that of the groom.

Note: separate in the marriage column refers to the practice of husbands and wives living in separate locations, often informally called walking marriages. See the articles for the specific cultures that practice this for further description.

References

Matriarchy
Cultural anthropology
Women in society
Feminism and society